Events from the year 1638 in Denmark.

Incumbents 

 Monarch – Christian IV

Events 
 Sorø is incorporated as a market town.
 Peder Winstrup is installed as Bishop of Lund.
 Jesper Brochmand is installed as Bishop of Zealand.

Culture

Art
 Henrik Werner completes the Orebygård altarpiece.
 Abraham Wuchters moves to Denmark and created a portrait of Christian IV.

Publications
 Christen Sørensen Longomontanus, Problemata duo Geometrica
 Jesper Brochmand, Päpstischer Warheit (1638)
 Jesper Brochmand, Sabbati sanctificatio aller Gudelig Betaenkning over alle Evangelier og Epistler paa Sondage og alle hellige Dage

Births 
 1 January – Nicolas Steno, scientist (died 1797)
 25 February – Jørgen Iversen Dyppel, governor of St. Thomas in the Danish West Indies (died 1683)
 20 July – Ulrik Frederik Gyldenløve, statesman (died 1704).
 23 December – Birgitte Skeel, landowner (died 1699)
Full date missing
 Brita Scheel, noblewoman (died 1699)

Deaths 
 Hans Poulsen Resen, clergy (born 1561)

References 

 
Denmark
Years of the 17th century in Denmark